is a 2017 Japanese historical drama television series and the 56th NHK taiga drama. It is written by Yoshiko Morishita and stars Ko Shibasaki as Ii Naotora.

Plot
During the Sengoku period, the Ii family governs the Totomi region. Due to many past wars, there are no more male successors left to become a lord. Naotora Ii (Kou Shibasaki), the only daughter of the lord, now becomes a lord. She faces a difficult period. The constant love from her fiancé, whom she became engaged to at a young age, helps her to keep moving forward.

Cast

Ii clan
Ko Shibasaki as Ii Naotora
Miu Arai as Otowa (young Naotora)
Haruma Miura as Ii Naochika
Kanata Fujimoto as Kamenojō (young Naochika)
Masaki Suda as Ii Naomasa, the adopted son of Naotora
Kokoro Terada as Toramatsu (young Naomasa)
Tetta Sugimoto as Ii Naomori
Naomi Zaizen as Chika
Shihori Kanjiya as Shino
Gin Maeda as Ii Naohira
Mari Hanafusa as Sana
Takashi Ukaji as Ii Naomitsu
Aki Asakura as Takase, Naomasa's half-sister
Hikaru Takahashi as young Takase
Shunsuke Kariya as Niino Chikanori
Yasuko Mitsuura as Ayame
Aoi Yoshikura as Kikyō
Marin as Sakura
Tsuyoshi Muro as Seto Hōkyū, a financial advisor
Yuki Yamada as Ihara "Suke'emon" Tomomasa
Masayo Umezawa as Take and Ume
Ono family
Issey Takahashi as Ono Masatsugu, a.k.a. "Tajima no kami"
Kai Kobayashi as Tsurumaru (young Masatsugu)
Mitsuru Fukikoshi as Ono Masanao, the father of Masatsugu
Yoshio Inoue as Ono Genba
Sayaka Yamaguchi as Natsu
Kai Inowaki as Ono Manpuku
Taketo Arai as Ono Inosuke (young Manpuku)
Nakano family
Toshio Kakei as Nakano Naoyoshi
Yūma Yamoto as Nakano "Yukinoji" Naoyuki
Keisuke Tomita as Nakano Naohisa
Okuyama family
Denden as Okuyama Tomotoshi, Shino's father
Miō Tanaka as Okuyama "Rokuza" Rokuzaemon
Monks of Ryōtan-ji
Kaoru Kobayashi as Nankei Osho
Hayato Ichihara as Ketsuzan
Shigekazu Komatsu as Kōten
Peasants
Gaku Yamamoto as Jinbei
Takashi Yamanaka as Hachisuke
Kō Maehara as Kakutarō
Takehiro Kimoto (TKO) as Tomisuke
Takayuki Kinoshita (TKO) as Fukuzō

Imagawa clan
Shunpūtei Shōta as Imagawa Yoshimoto, the master of the Ii clan
Ruriko Asaoka as Jukeini, the mother of Yoshimoto
Onoe Matsuya II as Imagawa Ujizane, Yoshimoto's heir
Tsubasa Nakagawa as young Ujizane
Shirō Sano as Taigen Sessai
Kenichi Yajima as Sekiguchi Ujitsune
Aki Nishihara as Haru (Lady Hayakawa), the wife of Ujizane and a daughter of Hōjō Ujiyasu
Hidetoshi Hoshida as a fake Ieyasu
Kyūsaku Shimada as Ōsawa Mototane
Kazutoyo Yoshimi as Nakayasu Hyōbu
Kazuyuki Aijima as Yamamura Shuri
Asahi Yoshida as Asahina Yasukatsu
Iinoya Triumvirate
Daikichi Sugawara as Suzuki Shigetoki
Jun Hashimoto as Kondō Yasumochi
Masanobu Sakata as Suganuma Tadahisa

Tokugawa clan
Sadao Abe as Tokugawa Ieyasu
Nanao as Sena
Seira Niwa as young Sena
Kinari Hirano as Matsudaira Nobuyasu
Raiki Komino as Takechiyo (young Nobuyasu)
Komaki Kurihara as Odai no Kata, the mother of Ieyasu
Seiji Rokkaku as Honda Masanobu
Ozuno Nakamura as Ishikawa Kazumasa
Tetsu Watanabe as Ōkubo Tadayo
Moro Moro'oka as Hiraiwa Chikayoshi
Soran Tamoto as Kogorō (Sakai Ietsugu)
The Four Heavenly Kings of the Tokugawa
Minosuke as Sakai Tadatsugu
Masahiro Takashima as Honda Tadakatsu
Toshinori Omi as Sakakibara Yasumasa
Matsushita
Masato Wada as Matsushita Jōkei, a spy
Kanji Furutachi as Matsushita Gentarō

Oda clan
Ichikawa Ebizō XI as Oda Nobunaga
Ken Mitsuishi as Akechi Mitsuhide
Sora Uehara as Tokuhime
Ryōta Sakanishi as Sakuma Nobumori
Shōzō Uesugi as Mizuno Tadashige
Seiji Kinoshita as Hasegawa Hidekazu
Rei Tanaka as Jinen, Mitsuhide's son

Takeda clan
Ken Matsudaira as Takeda Shingen
Eita Okuno as Takeda Katsuyori
Oreno Graffiti as Takeda Yoshinobu
Mari Kishi as Suzu, the wife of Yoshinobu and a sister of Imagawa Ujizane
Ryūji Yamamoto as Yamagata Masakage
Yōji Tanaka as Anayama Nobutada

Later Hōjō clan
Shinobu Tsuruta as Hōjō Ujiyasu
Tōru Shinagawa as Hōjō Gen'an
Etsuo Yokobori as Ogasawara Yasuhiro

Ryūun-maru's Bandits
Yūya Yagira as Ryūun-maru
Kōta Noura as young Ryūun-maru
Makita Sports as Mogura
Togi Makabe as Rikiya
Kengo Yoshida as Kaji
Kōki Maeda as Gokū
Takashi Ashida as Kuwa

Merchants of Kiga
Hirotarō Honda as Nakamura Yodayū
Takashi Matsuo as Iseya
Ichirō Ogura as Kumanoya

Others
Takurō Tatsumi as Chaya Shirōjirō Kiyonobu
Misaki Momose as Akane
Dankan as Negi
Yu Inaba
G.G. Sato
Moemi Katayama
Hajime Okayama as Gohei
Mansaku Fuwa
Yusuke Kodama
Shōdai Fukuyama
Yoshiyuki Morishita
Shigemitsu Ogi
Wataru Murakami

Family tree

Production

Production Credits
Music – Yoko Kanno
Title designer – Maaya Wakasugi
Historical research – Tetsuo Owada
Architectural research – Kiyoshi Hirai
Clothing research – Hiroaki Koizumi

Casting
Ko Shibasaki was announced to portray the lead role of the warlord Ii Naotora on August 25, 2015. The rest of the main cast was announced on May 26, 2016, which included Tetta Sugimoto, Naomi Zaizen, Gin Maeda, Kaoru Kobayashi, Haruma Miura, Issey Takahashi, and Yūya Yagira among others. The third cast announcement on July 12, 2016 included Shunpūtei Shōta, Once Matsuya II, Ruriko Asaoka, Sadao Abe, Nanao, Masaki Suda, and Hayato Ichihara among others.

Filming
The usual taiga drama production would first have one-third of the expected number of scripts finished before shooting begins. Afterwards, audience reception is taken into account as the rest of the series is written and shot. Filming began in September 2016.

Music
Yoko Kanno was announced as the series composer on November 16, 2016. By December 6, Paavo Järvi and Lang Lang were announced as the performers for the series' theme music.

Marketing
On November 16, 2016, the first visual poster for Naotora: The Lady Warlord was released.
A trailer for the drama was later released in December 2016.

Kotobukiya released Naotora-themed chopsticks in January 2017 to coincide with the series' broadcast.

TV schedule

Highlight

Soundtracks
NHK taiga drama Naotora: The Lady Warlord,  (January 11, 2017)
NHK taiga drama Naotora: The Lady Warlord,  (April 5, 2017)
NHK taiga drama Naotora: The Lady Warlord,  (August 23, 2017)
NHK taiga drama Naotora: The Lady Warlord,  (December 20, 2017)

See also

Sengoku period

References

External links
Official Site 

Taiga drama
2017 Japanese television series debuts
2017 Japanese television series endings
Cultural depictions of Akechi Mitsuhide
Cultural depictions of Oda Nobunaga
Cultural depictions of Tokugawa Ieyasu
Cultural depictions of Takeda Shingen
Television series set in the 16th century